The Way We Dance (狂舞派) is a 2013 Hong Kong film directed by Adam Wong Sau Ping and produced by Saville Chan.

Cast and roles
Cherry Ngan: Fleur
Babyjohn Choi: Alan
Lokman Yeung: Dave
Janice Fan: Rebecca
Tommy "Guns" Ly: Stormy
Julian Gaertner: Bruce

Awards and nominations

References

External links
 The Way We Dance 《狂舞派》 Official website (Traditional Chinese)
The Way We Dance

Hong Kong action films
Hong Kong dance films
2010s dance films
2010s Hong Kong films